The Tirhuta  or Maithili script is the primary historical script for the Maithili language, as well as one of the historical scripts for Sanskrit. It is believed to have originated in the 10th century CE. It is very similar to Bengali–Assamese script, with most consonants being effectively identical in appearance. For the most part, writing in Maithili has switched to the Devanagari script, which is used to write neighboring Central Indic languages to the west and north such as Hindi and Nepali, and the number of people with a working knowledge of Tirhuta has dropped considerably in recent years.

History and current status
Before 14th CE, Tirhuta was exclusively used to write Sanskrit, later Maithili was written in this script. Despite the near universal switch from Tirhuta to the Devanagari script for writing Maithili, some traditional pundits still use the script for sending one another ceremonial letters (pātā) related to some important function such as marriage. Metal type for this script was first produced in the 1920s, and digital fonts in the 1990s.

The 2003 inclusion of Maithili in the VIIIth Schedule of the Indian Constitution, having accorded official recognition to it as a language independent of Hindi, there is a possibility that this might lead to efforts to re-implement Tirhuta on a wider basis, in accord with similar trends in India reinforcing separate identities. However, currently, only Maithili in the Devanagari script is officially recognized.

Characters

Consonant letters 
Most of the consonant letters are effectively identical to Bengali–Assamese. The Unicode submission, for example, only bothered to create new graphic designs for 7 of the 33 letters: .

Vowels

Other signs

Numerals 
Tirhuta script uses its own signs for the positional decimal numeral system.

Image gallery
The first two images shown below are samples illustrating the history of Tirhuta. The first is the sacred sign of Ganesha, called āñjī, used for millennia by students before beginning Tirhuta studies. Displayed further below are images of tables comparing the Tirhuta and Devanagari scripts.

Unicode

Tirhuta script was added to the Unicode Standard in June 2014 with the release of version 7.0.

The Unicode block for Tirhuta is U+11480–U+114DF:

References

External links 
 Tirhuta at Omniglot

Brahmic scripts
Culture of Mithila
Maithili language
Writing systems of Nepal